WGGN (97.7 FM) is a radio station  broadcasting a Contemporary Christian format. Licensed to Castalia, Ohio, United States, the station serves the Sandusky area.  The station is currently owned by Christian Faith Broadcast, Inc.

See also
 WGGN-TV

References

External links

GGN